Leykin, Leikin, Lejkin, Leykind (feminine: Leykina, Leikina) are surnames of Ashkenazi Jewish origin. It is a Slavic-language-infliuenced matronymic surname derived from the Yiddish diminutive form "Leyka" of the given name Leah. Notable people with this surname include:

Boris Leykin, the namesake of the Leykina Island, Russia
Jakub Lejkin (1906-1952), Polish Jewish lawyer, Nazi collaborator, deputy commander of Warsaw Ghetto
 (born 1961), Russian clown, actor, and film director
Lindsay Sloane Leikin-Rollins (born  1977), American actress
Nikolai Leykin (1841 – 1906), Russian writer, artist, playwright, journalist and publisher
Polina Leykina (born 1994), Russian tennis player
 (born 1937) Russian poet and playwright

References

Yiddish-language surnames